The Príncipe white-eye (Zosterops ficedulinus) is a species of bird in the family Zosteropidae. The species was described by Gustav Hartlaub in 1866.  It is endemic to the islands of Príncipe and São Tomé, where it is restricted to the hilly interiors of the southern parts. Its natural habitats are subtropical or tropical moist lowland forests and subtropical or tropical moist montane forests. It is threatened by habitat loss.

References

Melo, M., B.H. Warren, and P.J. Jones. 2011. Rapid parallel evolution of aberrant traits in the diversification of the Gulf of Guinea white-eyes (Aves, Zosteropidae). Molecular Ecology. Published online 21 May 2011. doi: 10.1111/j.1365-294X.2011.05099.x

Príncipe white-eye
Endemic birds of São Tomé and Príncipe
Endemic fauna of Príncipe
Príncipe white-eye